Piedboeuf Brewery is a brewery in Jupille-sur-Meuse, Belgium. It is owned by Anheuser–Busch InBev. The main brand is Jupiler, the best selling beer in Belgium.

Variety

« Jupiler » is a 5.2% abv, pale lager. It is made from malt, maize (corn), water, hops and yeast. The name "Jupiler" comes from its place of origin, Jupille. It was created in 1966.
« Jupiler N.A. » a 0.5% abv pale lager, created in 2004.
« Jupiler Blue  » a 3.3% abv pale lager, created in 2006.
« Jupiler Force» a soda.
« Jupiler Tauro » an 8.3% abv strong pale lager, created in 2008.
« Piedbœuf Blonde » a 1.1% abv blond table beer.
« Piedbœuf Brune » a 1.5% abv brown table beer.
« Piedbœuf Triple » a 3.8% abv triple table beer.
« Piedbœuf Excellence » a 2% abv table beer.
« Piedbœuf Foncée» a 1.5% abv table beer.
« Delhaize Blond/ Blonde » a 1.5% abv table beer.
« Delhaize Bruin/ Brune » a 1.5% abv table beer.

As part of the Anheuser–Busch InBev group, it also brews other beer, including Stella Artois, Leffe and Hoegaarden

References

External links
InBev

Breweries of Wallonia
Companies based in Liège Province
Liège